Alexander Keiller (1 July 1804, Dundee – 27 March 1874 Gothenburg) was a Scottish businessman active in Gothenburg, Sweden.

Keiller arrived in Gothenburg in 1825, on account of the Keiller family's timber business in Sweden. Three years later he started a mill for machine spinning of flax and hemp, along with his compatriot William Gibson. This enterprise was shut down in 1839.

In 1841 Keiller opened a heavy engineering plant in Gothenburg, as a private company. In 1867 Keiller floated Göteborgs Mekaniska Verkstad on the stock exchange, and a year later he retired completely from the workshops. He died in Gothenburg on 27 March 1874 .

He was the father of James Keiller who in 1906 donated the area around Ramberget to Gothenburg city which here had built Keillers park.

References

External links

1804 births
1874 deaths
19th-century Scottish businesspeople
People from Gothenburg
Scottish emigrants to Sweden
19th-century Swedish businesspeople
Businesspeople from Dundee